The Malaysian People's Party (abbreviation: PRM; Malay: Parti Rakyat Malaysia) is a political party in Malaysia. Founded on 11 November 1955 as Partai Ra'ayat, it is one of the older political parties in Malaysia and traces its pedigree to the anti-colonial movements from the pre World War II period like the Kesatuan Melayu Muda.

It was part of the Malayan Peoples' Socialist Front coalition with the Labour Party of Malaya and was a force in the late 1950s and 1960s although the coalition was eventually decimated by politically-motivated detentions. In 1965, the party renamed itself Parti Sosialis Rakyat Malaysia in keeping with its scientific socialist ideology, but this was reversed in 1989.

Eventually, the party merged with Parti Keadilan Nasional to form Parti Keadilan Rakyat in 2003, but was revived by a minority of its former membership in 2005. It contested in the states of Penang, Kedah and Selangor in the 2018 elections after a period of political inactivity but failed to win a single seat. It is unrepresented in the Dewan Rakyat and state legislative assemblies of Malaysia.

History

Origins 

The founder of PRM, Ahmad Boestamam, was an activist of the leftist Kesatuan Melayu Muda (Young Malays Union; KMM). During the Japanese occupation of Malaya, he had briefly served as with the Japanese sponsored militia known as the Pembela Tanah Ayer (Defender of the Homeland) and later helped to organise co-operative communes run by the KMM.
 
With the capitulation of the Japanese in 1945, movements that collaborated with the Japanese like KMM likewise collapsed and the leftist Malay activists regrouped to organise various political movements, such as the Malay Nationalist Party (PKMM) led by Burhanuddin al-Helmy, the Angkatan Pemuda Insaf (Awakened Youth Organisation; API) led by Ahmad Boestamam and the Angkatan Wanita Sedar (Cohort of Awakened Women; AWAS) led by Shamsiah Fakeh. Boestamam was part of the PKMM and API delegation that participated in the Pan-Malayan Malay Congress in 1946 and was instrumental in keeping the Malay leftist movements out of the United Malays National Organisation (UMNO) that resulted out of the congress.

Growing opposition to the Malayan Union confederation led the British colonial authorities to consider an alternative constitutional framework for the country. A proposal known as the "Constitutional Proposals for Malaya" was developed in co-operation with UMNO and representatives of the Malay rulers. This proposal was opposed by a large segment of the non-Malay population of the country who saw it as discriminatory as well as a sizeable portion of the nationalists who saw it as delaying the self-determination and independence of Malaya.

A combination of anti-British sentiments and economic hardships saw the coalescing of the various political movements representing the Malay and non-Malay populations and eventually led to the formation of a broad coalition with the Malay movements represented in Pusat Tenaga Ra'ayat (People's United Front; PUTERA), itself a coalition of movements like PKMM, API, AWAS and others, and the non-Malay movements represented in the All-Malaya Council of Joint Action (AMCJA), another coalition of movements such as the Malayan Indian Congress, Malayan Democratic Union, and others.

The PUTERA-AMCJA tabled an alternative proposal known as the People's Constitutional Proposal and attempted to lobby for a Royal Commission to be formed to review the original proposals. The PUTERA-AMCJA also launched a successful nationwide hartal was organised on 20 October 1947, the same date where the constitutional proposals were due to be deliberated by the House of Commons in London.

Despite these efforts, PUTERA-AMCJA failed to overturn the decision to adopt the Constitutional Proposals which led to the formation of the Federation of Malaya on 31 January 1948. API was banned on 20 March 1948, gaining the distinction of being the first political movement in Malaya to be banned by the authorities and Boestamam was arrested on 1 July 1948. A declaration of emergency was extended nationwide on 12 July 1948 in what became the Malayan Emergency and resulted in the arrests and incarceration of many leftist and nationalist activists. Many who managed to escaped the dragnet joined the armed rebellion coordinated by the Communist Party of Malaya.

Foundation 
Upon his release from incarceration in 1955, Boestamam regrouped his supporters to form Partai Ra'ayat Malaya (People's Party). The new party was inaugurated on 11 November 1955 embracing a philosophy of nationalistic social democracy focussing on the poor known as Marhaenism, a phrase coined by Sukarno. It formed a coalition with the Labour Party of Malaya (LPM) led by another PKMM veteran, Ishak Haji Muhammad, which became known as the Malayan Peoples' Socialist Front or the Socialist Front in 1957.

Branches of PRM was formed in the neighbouring British protectorate of Brunei and the colony of Singapore in what eventually became the Brunei People's Party and Partai Rakyat Singapore (Singapore People's Party – not to be mistaken with the current Singapore People's Party). Both these branches eventually disappeared from active politics by the mid 1960s with the PRB banned in 1962 as a result of the Brunei revolt and the PRS never gaining enough support in Singapore for electoral success, with its president Said Zahari being arrested under Operation Coldstore before the 1963 Singaporean general election. The PRB is believed to be still operating in exile.

Early successes 
The party contested as part of the Socialist Front in both the 1959 Malayan state and federal elections and managed to capture a total of 16 state seats and eight federal. The coalition had most support in Penang and Selangor, and garnered a total of 12.91% of the popular vote in the federal election, becoming the third-largest party in parliament after the UMNO-led Alliance Party and the Pan-Malaysian Islamic Party, which was also led by a former member of KMM and PKMM, Burhanuddin al-Helmy.

While a majority of the coalition's elected representatives were from the Labour Party, Boestamam was elected Setapak MP and Karam Singh Veriah was elected MP for Damansara, giving PRM its only two elected MPs.

The SF further consolidated its gains in municipal elections including the City Council of Georgetown, Penang where it won 14 of the 15 seats in the Council during the 1961 Local Elections. The SF was further strengthened when the former Minister of Agriculture, Aziz Ishak, brought his National Convention Party (NCP) into the coalition.

Tunku Abdul Rahman's announcement for the expansion of Malaya into a larger federation known as Malaysia in 1961 galvanised the co-operation between the various Opposition parties in the Parliament. The SF found itself working on the same side as Parti Negara, the People's Progressive Party, the United Democratic Party, and the Pan-Malayan Islamic Party, in opposing the proposal due to the perception that it was being formulated by the Alliance without the consent of the people of the territories.

Persecution 
However, with the onset of the Indonesia-Malaysia Confrontation in 1962, opposition to the new federation came to be seen as being pro-Indonesia and anti-national. Boestamam, Ishak Muhammad, Aziz Ishak, and hundreds of others were subsequently arrested under the Internal Security Act. These factors cost the SF significant losses in the 1964 general election where PRM and the NCP failed to gain any seats at all and the LPM lost a significant number of seats, ending with just two.

With most of the senior leadership and a considerable number of members arrested, the coalition suffered organisationally. Furthermore, disagreements between PRM and LPM over the country's official language led to the coalition's demise in 1966.

Radicalisation 
The party underwent a radical change in 1965 when a group of young intellectuals led by Kassim Ahmad and Syed Husin Ali took over from Bosteamam, who left the party in response. The party was renamed Parti Sosialis Rakyat Malaysia (Malaysian People's Socialist Party; PSRM) and it officially adopted scientific socialism as its ideology.

While an understanding was reached in 1969 between PSRM and LPM , it did not result in any co-operation between the two parties.

Its final victories as an electoral force were in the 1969 elections when PSRM won two seats in Pahang through Dzulkifli Ismail (Ulu Kuantan) and S. Sivasubramaniam (Tanah Puteh) and one in Penang through Abdul Rahman Yunus (Balik Pulau).

However, the 1969 racial riots and the subsequent suspension of parliament meant they did not take their seats. The formation of the Barisan Nasional coalition together with the psot-riot political climate meant that the party remained on the sidelines.

Other leaders were also arrested under the ISA like Syed Husin Ali in 1974 and Kassim himself in 1976. This cost the party significant organisational cohesiveness that continued to plague it right into the next decade. Leaders like Kampo Radjo, Syed Husin and Abdul Razak Ahmad helped keep the party intact over the next decade.

Consolidation 
In the party's congress in 1989, the PSRM decided to revert to its previous name but retaining the term "Malaysia". A new leadership was also elected and Syed Husin was named party president while academic Sanusi Osman was elected secretary-general. The reversion to the name Parti Rakyat Malaysia was not without controversy and a group led by Mohd Nasir Hashim left the party. This group eventually formed the core that founded the Socialist Party of Malaysia (PSM).

The reorganised PRM contested the 1990 general elections as part of the Gagasan Rakyat coalition with the Democratic Action Party, Parti Melayu Semangat 46, All Malaysian Indian Progressive Front and Parti Bersatu Sabah. Although PRM failed to win any seats, it marked the beginning of the reversal of the party's fortunes.

The Gagasan Rakyat coalition did not survive the 1995 elections after the withdrawal of PBS and the dissolution of Semangat 46. Nonetheless, this was soon followed by the Reformasi movement that saw the creation of a new coalition known as Barisan Alternatif (Alternative Front) that grouped PRM, DAP, PMIP (now known as PAS) and the newly formed Parti Keadilan Nasional (National Justice Party; KeADILan).

PRM also gained an influx of younger members from the interest and political consciousness generated by the Reformasi movement during this period which rejuvenated the youth wing of the party. BA contested the 1999 general elections with PRM contesting three parliamentary seats in three state seats. The BA won 40.23% of the popular vote but PRM failed again to win any seats, although it did only lose one seat by a narrow margin of 8.4%.

Merger and revival 
Following the 1999 general elections, KeADILan began to explore the possibility of merger between the two parties. However the merger was delayed by the lengthy negotiations between the two parties. At the PRM annual congress in 2002 the concept of the merger was approved with nearly 80 percent of delegates voting in support.

The two parties officially merged on 3 August 2003 becoming Parti Keadilan Rakyat (People's Justice Party; PKR). PRM had to contest the 2004 general elections under Keadilan's symbol as the merger had yet to be approved by the authorities.

However, the 2004 elections almost routed the BA, with the coalition losing 22 seats out of the 42 it previously held. The poor performance of the new party some former PRM members to question the merger.

In April 2005, the dissidents convened a National Congress in Johor Bahru, taking advantage of the fact that the party had yet to be de-registered by the authorities, and elected a new executive committee led by former PRM youth leader Hassan Abdul Karim.. Other PRM stalwarts who took part in resurrecting the party included academic Rohana Ariffin and former political detainee Koh Swe Yong. However, Hassan would later make a switch back to PKR in 2009 after his proposal to join the Pakatan Rakyat coalition was rejected by the party congress.

Former PRM leaders who eventually gained or sustained a degree of prominence while in PKR included Syed Husin Ali, who served two terms in the Dewan Negara, Hassan Abdul Karim, who was elected Pasir Gudang MP in the 2018, trade unionist Syed Shahir Syed Mohamud who was elected MTUC president in 2004  and later served in the Dewan Negara, and Latheefa Koya who was appointed as head of the Malaysian Anti-Corruption Commission in 2019.

Recent activity 
PRM contested in the general elections of 2008, 2013, 2018 and  2022, without winning any federal or state legislative seats. PRM did not join the opposition coalition Pakatan Rakyat (2008-2015) or its successor Pakatan Harapan (2015–present).

In the lead-up to the 2018 general election, the party was joined by former Teratai assemblywoman, Jenice Lee Ying Ha, and former Kapar MP, S. Manikavasagam. Both contested in the election but failed to win their seats.

Ahead of the 2022 general election, the party announced that it would be contesting in 28 parliamentary seats, including all 14 seats in the state of Kelantan. The party ultimately nominated 16 candidates, all of whom lost their deposits. In the aftermath of the election, the PRM central committee unanimously voted to appoint former Umno and PKR politician Mohamad Ezam Mohd Nor deputy president of the party. Former party president Rohana Ariffin called this "tragic" news and asserted: "the party has shifted to the right-wing and we are seeing the demise of a left-wing party."

Leadership structure 

 President:
 Ariffin Salimon
 Secretary-General:
 Koh Swe Yong
 Deputy President:
 Mohd Ezam Mohd Nor
 Vice President:
 Azman Shah Bin Othman
 Ahmad Jufliz B Dato' Faiza
 Manikavasagam
 Yuvanesan a/l Balan (Pengerusi Angkatan Muda Rakyat)
 Treasurer:
 Norizwan Mohamed
 Information Chief:
 Tan Kang Yap
 Deputy Secretary-General:
 Shaqira Shauqi
 Youth Chief (Angkatan Rakyat Muda)
 Yuvanesan a/l Balan

 Central Committee Member:
 Dr Rohana Ariffin
 Tang Ah Ba
 P.V. Subramaniam
 Tham Poh Seng
 Lee Tze Kwang
 Nadarajah a/l Ramasamy
 Amirul Izwan B Johari
 Mohd Rafiq B Muhammad Arif
 Yusuf Che lah
 Zainol Ariff Bin Jamaluddin

General election results

State election results

Ideology 
PRM is currently centre-left in orientation and stresses the promotion of progressive values, of economic, political and human progress, democracy and basic human rights, unity of the people, ethical and cultural values, and the protection of the environment.

See also 
 Parti Sosialis Malaysia
 Malayan Peoples' Socialist Front
 Parti Rakyat Brunei
 Labour Party of Malaya
 Parti Keadilan Rakyat
 Ahmad Boestamam
 Kassim Ahmad
 Syed Husin Ali
 Abdul Razak Ahmad
 Hassan Abdul Karim
 List of political parties in Malaysia
 Politics of Malaysia

References

External links 
 Official Training Centre blog
 Unofficial blog
 S. K. Song

Democratic socialist parties in Asia
Socialist parties in Malaysia
Political parties in Malaysia
1955 establishments in Malaya
Political parties established in 1955